The Ray F. and Ethel Smith House, at 1697 E. Vine St. in Murray, Utah, was listed on the National Register of Historic Places in 2019.

It is a one-and-a-half-story "English Tudor period revival cottage" built in 1937, associated with early farming families in the area.

It is a stucco-covered wood-frame building with brick details, upon a concrete foundation.

A second contributing building on the property is a historic garage built 1955; there is also a non-contributing later garage.

References

Houses completed in 1937
Tudor Revival architecture in Utah
National Register of Historic Places in Salt Lake County, Utah
Buildings and structures in Murray, Utah
Houses on the National Register of Historic Places in Utah